Ajmer Rode is a Canadian author writing in Punjabi as well as in English. His first work was non-fiction Vishva Di Nuhar on Albert Einstein's Relativity in dialogue form inspired by Plato's Republic. Published by the Punjabi University in 1966, the book initiated a series of university publications on popular science and sociology. Rode's first poetry book Surti influenced by science and philosophical explorations was experimental and in words of critic Dr. Attar Singh 'has extended the scope of Punjabi language and given a new turn to Punjabi poetry'. His most recent poetry book Leela, more than 1000 pages long and co-authored with Navtej Bharati, is counted among the outstanding Punjabi literary works of the twentieth century.

Rode is regarded the founder of Punjabi theatre in Canada. He wrote and directed the first Punjabi play Dooja Passa dealing with racism faced by minorities. This was followed by his full-length play Komagata Maru based on a significant racial incident in British Columbia's history. Though it lacked professional direction the play generated considerable publicity inspiring theatrical interests in the Indian-Canadian community. Komagata Maru is the first full length Punjabi play written in Canada. His most recent English play Rebirth of Gandhi was produced at Surrey Arts Centre Canada) in 2004 to a full house.

Among Rode's significant translation is The Last Flicker an English rendering of a modern Punjabi classic novel Marhi Da Diva by Gurdial Singh who recently won the Gyan Peeth, India's highest literary award. The translation was published by the Indian Academy of Letters in 1993. Currently Rode is member of an international team of translators rendering Sufi songs from Urdu, Punjabi and Hindi into English; the project based in Los Angeles aims to produce a large multilingual book of original and translated songs sung by late Nusrat Fateh Ali Khan, the legendary Sufi singer of the twentieth century.

An active member of the Writers' Union of Canada, Ajmer Rode was on its national council in 1994 and later chaired its Racial Minority Writers Committee; Currently he is co-ordinator of Vancouver's Punjabi Writers Forum, the oldest and influential Punjabi writers association in Canada. He has been founding member of several other Indian-Canadian literary and performing arts associations including Watno Dur Art Foundation, and India Music Society founded to promote classical Indian music in North America. He was the first secretary of Samaanta, an organization to oppose violence against women and is now on the advisory board of Chetna, a Vancouver-based organization promoting minority rights and opposing Casteism. He has served on Canada Council and British Columbia Arts Council juries to award literary grants.
 
Rode was given the Best Overseas Punjabi Author award by the Punjab Languages Dept, India in 1994. Guru Nanak Dev University honored him with the "Prominent Citizen (literature)" award and the G.N. Engg. College with the "Poet of Life" award the same year. In Canada he has been honored with awards for Punjabi theatre and translation.

Original works

Vishava Di Nuhar, prose, Punjabi University, Patiala, 1966
Dooja Passa, one act plays, 1981
Komagata Maru, full-length play, 1983, 1999, 2013, 
Blue Meditations, poetry, 1985, 
Poems at My Doorstep, poetry, 1990, 2017, 
Surti, poetry, 1989, 1979, 
Shubhchintan, poetry, 1993, 2012, 
Leela, poetry, 1999 
Nirlajj, drama, Aesthetics Publications, India, 2008
Pash Da Sath, prose, 2016, published by WEB, Patiala 
Balbir Singh Bhangu (Life and Music), Libros LIbertad, Surrey, 2015,  
Selected Poems, Third Eye Publications, London, 2003, 2006, 2010, 2017, 
Chonvi Kavita, poems, Third Eye Publications, London, 2003, 2006, 2010, 2017, 
A Journey With The Endless Eye, Ekstasis Editions Canada Ltd., 2014,

Drama

Plays written and directed

Dooja Passa (one-act play) 
One Girl One Dream (one-act play) 
Visa (one-act play) 
Komagata Maru (full-length play)
One Girl One Dream (movie script)
Nirlajj (full-length play) 
Chetna (co-author), Third Eye publications
Turi Wala Kotha (direction), Stair to Nowhere (reading),
The Fragrant Grass (full-length, unpublished, readings)
Rebirth of Gandhi (full-length play in English)
Village of Men (6 TV scripts in English and Punjabi), 
produced by Abbotsford Community Services, 2007

Translations

The Last Flicker, Novel, 1993
Desire, poems, 1999
One Hundred One Surrealist Poems, 1996
Bird Talk, children's story 2001
Calendar Poems, poems, 2003
Dukh Sukh, poems, 2005

Editing

Punjabi Poetry of Canada, co-edited, 1980
Canadian Punjabi issue of the Preet Lari, 1986
Munch Katha, co-edited, 2002
Om Parkash, 2005

References

External links
Ajmer Rode (Archived 2009-10-24)
Interview on poetry

20th-century Canadian poets
Canadian male poets
21st-century Canadian poets
20th-century Canadian dramatists and playwrights
21st-century Canadian dramatists and playwrights
Indian emigrants to Canada
Canadian writers of Asian descent
Canadian people of Indian descent
Living people
Translators to English
20th-century translators
21st-century translators
Canadian male dramatists and playwrights
20th-century Canadian male writers
21st-century Canadian male writers
Year of birth missing (living people)